The 2019–20 season was the 142nd in the history of Wolverhampton Wanderers and the 3rd under then-head coach Nuno Espírito Santo. In that season, they competed in the Premier League for the 2nd consecutive time, the EFL Cup, the FA Cup and in a UEFA/continental competition for the first time since 1980–81 through/via the UEFA Europa League.

As a result of the suspension of competitive football in March 2020 due to the COVID-19 pandemic, the club were unable to play any match for 3 months since the UEL match on 12 March. A restart of the Premier League was made on 17 June, with the club returning to action 3 days later.

The team repeated their 7th-place finish of the previous Premier League season – with an improved points tally – but, as a result of Arsenal winning the FA Cup, this position was not sufficient to qualify for the UEFA Europa League again. A top-6 position would only have been guaranteed with victory on the final day, but Wolves lost 0–2 at Chelsea. Their continental campaign concluded at the quarter-final stage of a modified single-leg final tournament in Germany with defeat to the eventual winners Sevilla, lasting 383 days in total and signified their best performance in a UEFA competition since reaching the inaugural UEFA Cup Final in 1972.

Competitions

Pre-season
Wolves were one of four teams invited to take part in the biennial Premier League Asia Trophy, which the team won. Owing to their participation in the qualifying rounds of the Europa League, these were the only other games the club undertook before the start of the league season.

Mid-season friendlies

Premier League

League table

Results summary

Results by matchday

Results
The provisional fixture list was released on 13 June 2019, but was subject to change in the event of matches being selected for television coverage or police concerns. The coronavirus pandemic caused the suspension of all fixtures scheduled between 11 March and the planned end of the season on 17 May. Revised fixture lists for the matchdays following the resumption of the league were published on 5 June and 18 June 2020.

FA Cup

As a Premier League team, Wolves entered the competition at the third round proper stage in January 2020. The third round draw was made live on BBC Two from Etihad Stadium on 3 December 2019, Micah Richards and Tony Adams conducted the draw.

EFL Cup

As a Premier League team involved in European competition, Wolves enter the competition in the third round. The third round draw was confirmed on 28 August 2019, live on Sky Sports. The draw for the fourth round was made on 25 September 2019.

UEFA Europa League

Qualifying stage

As a result of their seventh place league finish in the previous season as well as Manchester City winning all 3 domestic trophies on offer that season, Wolves entered the competition in the second round qualifying round whose draw was confirmed on 19 June 2019. The draw for the third round qualifying round was made on 22 July 2019 prior to the second round qualifying round matches. The play-off round draw was announced on 5 August 2019. Wolves were seeded in all three draws.

Group stage

The draw for the group stage was held on 30 August 2019. The club were drawn from pot 3 into Group K to face Beşiktaş, Braga and Slovan Bratislava.
Final table

Results

Knockout phase

The draw for the round of 32 was held on 16 December 2019. The club was unseeded due to finishing as runners-up in the group stage. The round of 16 ties were determined by an open draw held on 28 February 2020. The return leg of the team's round of 16 tie was postponed from its original date of 19 March due to the COVID-19 pandemic. In order to conclude the competition as promptly as possible, UEFA decided to organise a single-leg mini tournament in Germany for the final eight teams. An open draw was conducted to this end on 10 July 2020.

EFL Trophy

Wolves were one of the sixteen teams from outside the bottom two divisions of the English Football League to be invited to field their academy team in the competition due to it holding Category 1 academy status. They were drawn into Group G in the Northern section, from which they advanced in second place. Note: In group stage matches which were level at the end of 90 minutes a penalty shoot-out was held, with the winner earning a bonus point.

Players

Statistics

|-
|align="left"|||align="left"|||align="left"| 
|||4||||0||1||0||11||3||||7||2||0||
|-
|align="left"|||align="left"|||style="background:#faecc8; text-align:left;"|  ‡
|||0||||0||2||0||3||0||style="background:#98FB98"|||0||3||0||
|-
|align="left"|||align="left"|||align="left"|  ¤
|||0||||0||2||0||||1||||1||2||0||
|-
|align="left"|||align="left"|||align="left"| 
|||0||||0||||1||||0||style="background:#98FB98"|||1||0||0||
|-
|align="left"|||align="left"|||align="left"| 
|||3||||0||2||0||||2||style="background:#98FB98"|||5||6||0||
|-
|align="left"|||align="left"|||align="left"| 
|||2||||0||1||0||||2||||4||10||0||
|-
|align="left"|||align="left"|||align="left"| 
|||17||||0||0||0||||10||||27||7||0||
|-
|align="left"|10||align="left"|||align="left"|  ¤
|||2||||0||2||1||||0||style="background:#98FB98"|||3||1||0||
|-
|align="left"|10||align="left"|||align="left"| 
|||1||||0||0||0||||0||style="background:#98FB98"|||1||1||0||
|-
|align="left"|11||align="left"|||align="left"| 
|38||0||||0||0||0||15||0||53||0||0||0||
|-
|align="left"|15||align="left"|||align="left"| 
|22||0||||0||0||0||13||1||35||1||2||1||
|-
|align="left"|16||align="left"|||align="left"| 
|38||0||||0||0||0||17||0||57||0||6||0||
|-
|align="left"|17||align="left"|||align="left"| 
|||0||||0||1||0||||1||||1||1||0||
|-
|align="left"|18||align="left"|||align="left"| 
|||7||||0||0||0||||9||||16||5||1||
|-
|align="left"|19||align="left"|||align="left"| 
|||2||||0||0||0||||0||||2||6||0||
|-
|align="left"|21||align="left"|||align="left"| 
|||0||||0||2||0||2||0||||0||0||0||
|-
|align="left"|23||align="left"|||align="left"|  ¤
|||0||||0||1||0||0||0||style="background:#98FB98"|||0||1||0||
|-
|align="left"|26||align="left"|||align="left"| 
|||0||||0||||0||||0||style="background:#98FB98"|||0||1||0||
|-
|align="left"|27||align="left"|||align="left"| 
|||2||||0||0||0||||1||||3||14||1||
|-
|align="left"|28||align="left"|||align="left"| 
|||1||||0||0||0||||0||||1||11||0||
|-
|align="left"|29||align="left"|||align="left"| 
|||0||||0||2||0||||2||||2||1||0||
|-
|align="left"|30||align="left"|||align="left"| 
|||0||||0||0||0||||0||||0||0||0||
|-
|align="left"|32||align="left"|||align="left"| 
|||4||||0||0||0||||2||||6||7||0||
|-
|align="left"|33||align="left"|||align="left"|  ¤
|||0||||0||0||0||||0||||0||0||0||
|-
|align="left"|37||align="left"|||align="left"| 
|||4||||0||0||0||||2||||6||2||0||
|-
|align="left"|39||align="left"|||align="left"| 
|||0||||0||||0||0||0||style="background:#98FB98"|||0||0||0||
|-
|align="left"|40||align="left"|||align="left"| 
|||0||||0||0||0||||0||||0||0||0||
|-
|align="left"|49||align="left"|||align="left"| 
|||0||||0||2||0||5||0||||0||3||0||
|-
|align="left"|54||align="left"|||align="left"| 
|||0||||0||0||0||||0||style="background:#98FB98"|||0||0||0||
|-
|align="left"|56||align="left"|||align="left"|  ¤
|||0||||0||||0||||0||||0||0||0||
|-
|align="left"|57||align="left"|||align="left"| 
|||0||||0||||0||0||0||style="background:#98FB98"|||0||0||0||
|-
|align="left"|58||align="left"|||align="left"|  ¤
|||0||||0||0||0||||0||||0||0||0||
|-
|align="left"|59||align="left"|||align="left"| 
|||0||||0||0||0||1||0||||0||0||0||
|-
|align="left"|62||align="left"|||align="left"| 
|||0||||0||0||0||||0||||0||0||0||
|-
|align="left"|66||align="left"|||align="left"|  †
|||0||||0||||0||0||0||style="background:#98FB98"|||0||0||0||
|-
|align="left"|68||align="left"|||align="left"| 
|||0||||0||||0||0||0||style="background:#98FB98"|||0||0||0||
|-
|align="left"|75||align="left"|||align="left"| 
|||0||||0||0||0||||0||||0||0||0||
|-
|align="left"|76||align="left"|||align="left"| 
|||0||||0||0||0||||0||||0||0||0||
|-
|align="left"|77||align="left"|||align="left"| 
|||0||||0||1||0||||0||style="background:#98FB98"|||0||0||0||
|-
|}

Awards

Transfers

Transfers in

Loans in

Transfers out

Loans out

Kits

Notes

References

Wolverhampton Wanderers
Wolverhampton Wanderers F.C. seasons